Vermin in Ermine is the début solo studio album by the British singer/songwriter Marc Almond. It was released in October 1984 and reached number 36 on the UK Albums Chart. Vermin in Ermine includes the singles "The Boy Who Came Back", "You Have" and "Tenderness is a Weakness".

Almond with his new assembled band The Willing Sinners - an evolution from his previous outfit Marc and the Mambas - featuring Annie Hogan, Billy McGee, Martin McCarrick, Richard Riley and Steven Humphreys, accompanied by studio musicians recorded the songs for album at Hartmann Digital Studios, Bavaria. The artwork was designed by Huw Feather from a concept by Almond with photography by Peter Ashworth.

Track listing

LP

CD and Cassette

Personnel
 Marc Almond – vocals, all arrangements, design concept
 The Willing Sinners
 Annie Hogan – piano, vibes
 Billy McGee – bass (bowed and plucked)
 Martin McCarrick – cello, keyboards
 Richard Riley – guitar
 Steven Humphreys – drums
with:
 Gary Barnacle – saxophone
 Enrico Tomasso – trumpet, flugelhorn; trumpet arrangement on "Hell Was a City"
 Gini Ball – violin
 Zeke Manyika – drums on "Pink Shack Blues" and "Ugly Head"
 Martin Ditcham – percussion, tympani on "Tenderness is a Weakness"
 Spiros – bouzouki on "Shining Sinners"
 Nancy Peppers – backing vocals on "The Boy Who Came Back" and "Pink Shack Blues"
Technical
 Mike Hedges – producer
 Tom Thiel – engineer
 Flood – engineer on "Shining Sinners" and "Crime Sublime"
 Billy McGee, Gini Ball, Martin Ditcham – string arrangements
 Peter Ashworth – cover photography
 Huw Feather – design
 Rizz – glamour wear

References

1984 debut albums
Marc Almond albums
Albums produced by Mike Hedges
Vertigo Records albums
Some Bizzare Records albums